Tomas Seyler (born 16 July 1974), nicknamed "Shorty", is a German former professional darts player.

Career

Seyler reached the second round of the Winmau World Masters in 2003, beating Vincent van der Voort in the first round, but lost to Raymond van Barneveld. He also reached the Quarter-Finals of the World Darts Trophy in 2004, beating Bob Taylor and Tony West before losing to Martin Adams. He won the German Gold Cup in 2005.

Seyler made his PDC debut at the 2006 PDC World Darts Championship, he beat crowd favourite Jamie Harvey of Scotland in the first round but lost to the Netherlands' Roland Scholten in round two. He returned to Purfleet for the 2007 PDC World Darts Championship but the German number one lost in the first round to World number one Colin Lloyd.

He also frequently appears on German TV channel Sport1 and streaming service DAZN as co-commentator on PDC darts tournaments.

World Championship results

PDC

2006: 2nd round (lost to Roland Scholten 2–4)
2007: 1st round (lost to Colin Lloyd 0–3)
2010: Last 72 (lost to Jan van der Rassel 1–4 in legs)
2014: 1st round (lost to Kevin Painter 0–3)

External links
Profile and stats on Darts Database

1974 births
Living people
German darts players
Professional Darts Corporation former tour card holders
Sportspeople from Bremerhaven